Werewolves have featured a number of times in the long-running British science fiction television series Doctor Who and its other media tie-ins. The various media may not even be consistent with respect to each other.

Television series

The Greatest Show in the Galaxy
The first time a werewolf appeared in the television series was in the Seventh Doctor serial The Greatest Show in the Galaxy (1988). A wolf-man appears in the 1986 Sixth Doctor story Mindwarp, and the primords in the 1970 Third Doctor story Inferno are also lupine in appearance, but in both cases these are induced mutations rather than people who switched between 
human and wolf forms.

Mags is a young woman who appeared human, the companion of the interplanetary explorer Captain Cook, who said that he found her on the planet Vulpana. The Doctor and Ace meet the pair while investigating the Psychic Circus on the planet Segonax.

Ultimately, Mags is revealed to be a werewolf, her transformation triggered by moonlight. Cook triggers her metamorphosis in an attempt to kill the Doctor for the amusement of the primeval Gods of Ragnarok, but the Doctor convinces her that she could control her feral instincts, and Mags turns on the Captain instead. After the Doctor has defeated the Gods of Ragnarok, Mags elects to remain behind on the planet with Kingpin, the only survivor of the Psychic Circus.

No other details about Mags—her species, whether all of her race transform into werewolves, or even if she did originate on Vulpana itself—are provided during the story.

"Tooth and Claw"
A werewolf is the principal antagonist in the Tenth Doctor episode "Tooth and Claw" (2006). This werewolf is an alien entity that fell to Earth in Scotland in 1540, where it landed in St. Catherine's Glen near a monastery. The Doctor surmises that only a single cell survived, which was then incubated in various hosts via biting them, passing down through the centuries until it matured. The Doctor describes it as a "lupine wavelength haemovariform". The werewolf shows an aversion to mistletoe, although whether this was a physical allergy or a conditioned reflex (as suggested by the Doctor) is not established.

The wolf cell was cultivated in young boys kidnapped by the monks of the monastery, the Brethren, who turned away from worshipping God and began to worship the wolf instead. The hosts would react to moonlight and transform into werewolves at the full moon, leading to dead livestock and legends of lycanthropy in the surrounding area.

Eventually, in 1879, the Brethren arrange for Queen Victoria to be diverted to the nearby Torchwood Estate where the current host would infect her with the wolf cell, leading to the creation of the "Empire of the Wolf". The plot is thwarted by the Doctor and Rose, who use a telescope constructed by the father of Sir Robert MacLeish against the werewolf. The telescope is in actuality a gigantic light amplification chamber and, using the Koh-i-Noor diamond as a focusing element, strikes the werewolf with enough moonlight to dispel it from the planet. It is unclear, however, if Victoria is indeed infected in the end.

Novels

Kursaal
In the Eighth Doctor Adventures novel Kursaal by Peter Anghelides, the Eighth Doctor and Sam travel to Saturnia Regina, which is about to be turned into a theme park planet and renamed Kursaal. However, beneath the proposed attractions are the homes of the Jax, a wolf-like species thought extinct. When the archaeological teams investigating the Jax ruins are killed by a wolf-shaped creature, the Doctor and Sam investigate, discovering that the victims transformed into wolves when triggered by moonlight. The dead become mindless drones, while those infected but still living retain their senses, thereafter working to further the agenda of the Jax.

It is revealed that the Jax are not the wolves, but the virus that causes the transformation itself, controlled by ancient Jax technology contained within their cathedral. Sam is infected, but the Doctor manages to destroy the Jax technology and she is returned to normal with no ill effects.

Wolfsbane
In the Past Doctor Adventures novel Wolfsbane by Jacqueline Rayner, it is stated that in 1933, Nazi Germany became aware of the existence of werewolves and forced them to register with the government. A group of them were imprisoned in camp surrounded by silver barbed wire and pressed into state service. In 1934, these werewolves are used to commit the purge that became known as the Night of the Long Knives. One of these werewolves, Emmeline Neuberger, manages to escape into the German woods. The transformation of these werewolves is also tied to moonlight.

Neuberger surfaces in England two years later, unwillingly assisting Lady Hester Stanton who wants to magically bind the land to herself. Harry Sullivan is present at the time, having been stranded there when the TARDIS—later implied to have been drawn off-course by its damaged future self— inexplicably left without him; Harry joins forces with the amnesic Eighth Doctor to thwart Hester's plans. The Fourth Doctor and Sarah return for Harry, but not before Neuberger, desiring a mate, bites him. What happens to Harry next is unclear; the Eighth Doctor Adventures novel Sometime Never... references various manipulations of time enacted by the Council of Eight, especially regarding the Doctor's companions, some of which are later undone. It remains unclear whether Harry's infection is one of them; however, given the character's subsequent history in other tie-in fiction, it can be assumed that his condition is eventually cured or at least controlled.

The Empire Of The Wolf
In this Decide Your Destiny novel, the reader is allowed to affect the actions with their choices. There are many choices, but all seem to feature similar characters: the Eleventh Doctor, Amy Pond, Dr Lazenger (a werewolf keeping back his transformation by willpower) and Doctor Adams, one of Lazenger's employees. Werewolves descended from a Torchwood maid infected with the haemovariform arrive in Aberdeen to have the original crashed haemovariform extract the werewolf part of them and transfer it to the world. The many endings include the plans going ahead, the Moon being stopped, the Doctor deactivating it, the haemovariform being killed with mistletoe oil, and Lazenger dying to stop it. In several different versions, the character is turned into a werewolf and has to join the original werewolves to cure them.

Audio plays

Loups-Garoux
In the Big Finish Productions audio play Loups-Garoux, the Fifth Doctor and Turlough encounter a race of werewolves in Rio de Janeiro in 2080. It is said that werewolves are one of the planet's oldest races and are extremely long-lived. One of them, Pieter Stubbe, even claims to have been around at the time of the Earth's creation.

These werewolves are tied to the cycles and elemental power of the Earth, and are weakened if separated from it (even by being on the upper floors of a building). The werewolf mutation could be transmitted by a bite as well — Stubbe had transformed Illeana de Santos into a werewolf in 1812. By 2080, de Santos has become leader of the werewolves, and Stubbe attempts to reclaim her as his mate. With the aid of the Doctor and Turlough, Stubbe's hold on de Santos's pack is broken. Stubbe himself ages to death when he rushed into the TARDIS and the Doctor materialises the ship in orbit, severing Stubbe's connection with the Earth.

Comic strips

Doctor Who and the Dogs of Doom
In the Doctor Who Weekly comic strip story Doctor Who and the Dogs of Doom (DWW #27-#34), the Fourth Doctor and Sharon meet a race of wolf-like humanoids called the Wereloks in the year 2430. While the Wereloks do not transform from human to werewolf, their fangs inject a venom that transforms those they bite into Wereloks when their bodies are subjected to light of a certain intensity, like moonlight. The Doctor is himself infected but manages to find a cure for his condition.

The Wereloks are used as a slave race by the Daleks, who send them to raid the New Earth system (no relation to the planet seen in "New Earth") as a prelude to sterilising the system of human life so the Daleks can use it as a breeding ground. Together with the human colonists and the help of a tamed Werelok named Brill, the Doctor "time locks" the Dalek army and their Werelok soldiers in a single moment of time and space.

Similarities
The various types of werewolf seen as described above share certain similarities: for example, the exposure to moonlight triggering the transformation and the transmission of the mutation by biting. The Jax infection also sounds similar to the one in "Tooth and Claw" (although the Jax had a technological base), and the Earth-bound wolves of Loups-Garoux bear some similarities to the ones featured in Wolfsbane.

Equally, it is tempting to draw a connection between the extraterrestrial werewolf of "Tooth and Claw" and Mags (and possibly Vulpana) in The Greatest Show in the Galaxy, but there is no explicit evidence that ties them, or any of these, together. It is equally possible that they are completely unrelated.

See also
Werewolves in fiction

Doctor Who races
Television episodes about werewolves